Menno Vloon (born 11 May 1994) is a Dutch pole vaulter.

Career
He finished eighth at the 2015 European U23 Championships. He also competed at the 2012 World Junior Championships, the 2016 European Championships and the 2017 World Championships without reaching the final.

In 2021 he set a Dutch national indoor record with 5.96 metres.

Achievements

1No mark in the final

References

External links

1994 births
Living people
Dutch male pole vaulters
World Athletics Championships athletes for the Netherlands
People from Zaanstad
Athletes (track and field) at the 2020 Summer Olympics
Olympic athletes of the Netherlands
21st-century Dutch people